The San Leandro Hills are a low mountain range of the Southern Inner California Coast Ranges System, located on the eastern side of the San Francisco Bay.  Geologically, they are a southern continuation of the Berkeley Hills on the north.

They run along the southeastern city limits of Oakland, extending southeastward above the city of San Leandro and the unincorporated community of Castro Valley.

San Leandro Creek drains the canyon along the eastern slope of the hills.

References

Mountain ranges of Alameda County, California
Berkeley Hills
California Coast Ranges
Geography of San Leandro, California
Geography of Oakland, California
Mountain ranges of the San Francisco Bay Area
Mountain ranges of Northern California